The tenor is a type of male singing voice and is the highest male voice within the modal register. The typical tenor voice lies between C3 (C one octave below middle C), to the high C (C5). The low extreme for tenors is roughly A2 (two octaves below middle C). At the highest extreme, some tenors can sing up to F one octave above middle C (F5).

The term tenor was developed in relation to classical and operatic voices, where the classification is based not merely on the singer's vocal range but also on the tessitura and timbre of the voice. For classical and operatic singers, their voice type determines the roles they will sing and is a primary method of categorization. In non-classical music, singers are primarily defined by their genre and their gender and not by their vocal range. When the terms soprano, mezzo-soprano, contralto, tenor, baritone, and bass are used as descriptors of non-classical voices, they are applied more loosely than they would be to those of classical singers and generally refer only to the singer's perceived vocal range.

The following is a list of singers in various music genres and styles (most of which can be found on the List of popular music genres) who have been described as tenors. Additionally, if the singer is known for being a member of a band, they are listed with the band's name.

List of names

See also
List of basses in non-classical music
List of baritones in non-classical music
List of contraltos in non-classical music
List of mezzo-sopranos in non-classical music
List of sopranos in non-classical music

Notes

References

Tenors
Tenors